I Am is the debut album by American R&B recording artist Chrisette Michele, released in the United States on June 19, 2007 by Def Jam Recordings.

Production
Michele began working on the music that would make up I Am before she had a recording contract, and started promoting her work by visiting events for independent artists. During this time, she caught the attention of L.A. Reid, who later signed her to Island Def Jam, where she got support from producers such as Babyface, will.i.am, and John Legend.

The video for the album's lead single "If I Have My Way" premiered on VH1 Soul. The video for her second single "Best of Me" premiered on July 6, 2007 on Yahoo! Music, and was later added to VH1's video rotation. "Be OK", which features will.i.am, was released as the third single from the album, whose music video was on BET's 106 & Park on December 18, 2007. "Love Is You" was the fourth and final single and was released in 2008.

Reception

I Am debuted at number twenty-nine on the US Billboard 200, selling 26,000 copies in its first week. Despite lack of promotion, the album has thus far managed to sell 419,000 units in the United States as of late February 2009.

I Am received generally positive reviews. Internet publication AllHipHop gave the album a stellar rating, stating: "She is Chrisette Michele and with her debut, I Am (Def Jam), this constituent of the House of Hov delivers one of the quietest, yet most powerful albums out there." The album's third single, "Be OK", won the 2009 Grammy Award for Best Urban/Alternative Performance.

Track listing

Sample credits
"Good Girl" contains a sample from "Move Over" performed by The Soul Children.
"Be OK" contains a sample from "Could You Be Loved" performed by Bob Marley & the Wailers.
"Let's Rock" contains a sample from "Here We Go" performed by Run D.M.C.

Personnel

Musicians

Chrisette Michele – singing, backing vocals
Face – acoustic guitar, drums
Lino Gomez – bass clarinet
Vincent Henry – baritone saxophone
Christopher Johnson – drums
Norris "Sirone" Jones – guitar
Lisa Kim – violin
Gail Kruvand – bass
John Legend – piano
Rob Lewis – keyboards
Emily Mitchell – bass clarinet

Eileen Moon – cello
Sandra Park – violin
Bruce Purse – bass trumpet
Salaam Remi – bass, drums, guitar, piano
Robert Smith III – drums
Qiang Tu – cello
Jeremy Turner – cello
Omari Williams – drums
Steve Williamson – clarinet
Kelvin Wooten – bass, organ, piano
Sharon Yamada – violin

Production

Chrisette Michele – producer
Babyface – producer, keyboard programming
Stephen Barber – string arrangements
A.J. Benson – A&R
Shalik Berry – A&R
Paul Boutin – engineer
Thom Cadley – engineer
Lysa Cooper – stylist
Dwayne"Whateva" Lindsey - Producer
Andrew Dawson – engineer
Nichell Delvaille – art coordinator, photo coordination
Gleyder "Gee" Disla – assistant
Dylan Dresdow – mixing engineer
Doug "Biggs" Ellison – programming, executive producer, management, vocal editing
Anthony Gallo – vocal engineer
Jon Gass – mixing
GI Joe – producer
Don Goodrick – assistant engineer
Christopher "Jazz" Grant – engineer
Bernie Grundman – mastering
Courtney Harris – assistant engineer
Q. Nicole Jackson – A&R
Matt Jones – photography

Doug Joswick – package production
Hyomin Kang – assistant engineer
John Legend – producer
Rob Lewis – string arrangements
Riley Mackin – engineer
Manny Marroquin – mixing
Tony Maserati – mixing
Mo Jaz – producer
Amber Noble – marketing
Linette Payne – personal manager
Kevin Randolph – producer
L.A. Reid – executive producer
Kendal "KD" Revanales – programming, engineer, vocal editing
Rubin Rivera – engineer
Mark Roule – digital editing, mixing assistant
Joseph Smart – engineer
Jason Stasium – engineer
David Lee Stewart – producer
Matt Taylor – design
Nadia Vessel – hair stylist
will.i.am – producer
Kelvin Wooten – producer, string arrangements
Patricia Yankee – grooming

Charts

Weekly charts

Year-end charts

Release history

References

2007 debut albums
Chrisette Michele albums
Def Jam Recordings albums
Jazz albums by American artists
Albums produced by Babyface (musician)
Albums produced by John Legend
Albums produced by Salaam Remi
Albums produced by will.i.am
Albums recorded at Chung King Studios